Pacha Group is a Spanish holding company specializing in the leisure, entertainment and hospitality businesses. It was founded in 1966 by Ricardo Urgell.

Brand
Pacha is a lifestyle and entertainment brand which specializes in nightlife and has club franchises in a number of countries including Brazil, United States, Russia, Germany, England, Egypt, Portugal, Austria and several Spanish cities including Madrid, Valencia, Bilbao and Barcelona. The first Pacha club opened in the beach town of Sitges in 1967 and first expanded to Barcelona and the Catalan coast.

In Ibiza, Pacha opened a club in 1973, and then expanded into the hotel business with El Hotel Pacha.

The first Pacha club outside Spain opened in 1993 in Buenos Aires, Argentina. Then in Munich in 2000.

Pacha London opened in 2001 and closed in 2014.

Additionally, Pacha publishes annual music compilations with the Pacha branding on various Music Platforms (incl. Spotify, iTunes, Google Play Music, etc.), starting in 2008. They also release tracks under their Record label 'Pacha Recordings', and 'Pacha Multimedia S.L.'.

Logo
Pacha's first logo was inspired by Carmen Sevilla’s eye make-up. Later, in the seventies, various anagrams (of fruits) were created to distinguish various bureaucratic activities in the company internally. Finally, the image of the cherries was printed on a large number of posters to announce events and parties.

Founder
Ricardo Urgell, born in Barcelona in 1937, is the founder of Grupo Pacha. He is the grandson of Modesto Urgell. When Urgell was twenty years old, he started a water-ski school in Sitges. He then opened his first bar ‘Tito’s’ in the same town. The name "Pachá" came from a remark made by Marisa Cobos, Urgell's first wife, who told him that with the money he was going to earn, he would be living like a Pachá (an Arabian Prince). The first Pacha club was Pacha Sitges, which Urgell founded together with his brother Piti Urgell.

In 2002, the Spanish Government decided to award the Gold Medal of Merit for Tourism to Ricardo Urgell.

Pacha Ibiza

Pacha Ibiza opened in 1973 and is the earliest superclub in Ibiza. Built in Ses Feixes and facing Ibiza Town, Pacha was designed to resemble a farmhouse. The club was featured in the 2004 film It's All Gone Pete Tong and has capacity of 3,000. From 1998 to 2017, Pacha Ibiza was the venue for the DJ Awards.

Awards and nominations

DJ Magazine's top 100 Clubs

International Dance Music Awards

International Nightlife Association's Top 100 Clubs

Pacha New York / Miami

Awards and nominations

DJ Magazine's top 100 Clubs

Pacha Sharm

Awards and nominations

DJ Magazine's top 100 Clubs

Notes

References

External links

 

Franchises
Drinking establishment chains
Electronic dance music venues
Spanish companies established in 1967
Holding companies established in 1967
Entertainment companies established in 1967